Abdellah Mecheri (born 13 May 1952) is an Algerian football manager. He has managed several clubs in the Algerian Ligue Professionnelle 1.

Career
Abdellah Mecheri has a greet national and international career. In Algeria he managed MC Oran, ASM Oran, MC Alger, SA Mohammadia, CA Bordj Bou Arréridj, MO Béjaïa.
Outside of Algeria, he managed MC Oujda, Al-Shoalah Club, Al-Ta'ee Club, Bahrain SC.

Honours
Algerian Ligue 1
Champion (2): 1992, 1993 with MC Oran
Runners-up (9): 1985 with MC Oran
Algerian Cup
Winner (4): 1984, 1985 with MC Oran
Runners-up (2): 2002 with MC Oran

References

External links
 

1952 births
Living people
People from Oran
Algerian football managers
ASM Oran players
MC Oran managers
Al-Ta'ee managers
Al-Shoulla FC managers
GC Mascara managers
JS Saoura managers
Algerian Ligue Professionnelle 1 managers
Saudi First Division League managers
Expatriate football managers in Bahrain
Expatriate football managers in Morocco
Expatriate football managers in Saudi Arabia
Algerian expatriate sportspeople in Bahrain
Algerian expatriate sportspeople in Morocco
Algerian expatriate sportspeople in Saudi Arabia
21st-century Algerian people